Marijan Buljat (born 12 September 1981, in Zadar) is a Croatian retired football player who last played as a wingback for Arbanasi Zadar.

Club career
Born in Zadar and a product of the NK Zadar academy, Buljat moved soon after finishing his youth career to NK Rijeka. After a year and a half there he moved in January 2002 to the 2. Bundesliga side Greuther Fürth, signing a 2.5-year contract. After featuring in only a few friendlies for the first side and playing mostly for the Greuther Fürth amateur team in the Oberliga Bayern, he moved in January 2003 back to Croatia, to NK Osijek. After another one and half there, he was signed, in summer 2004, by Dinamo Zagreb. In January 2007 Buljat's left leg was broken by the Croatia national team striker Eduardo in training. In a cruel twist of irony Eduardo's own leg was broken by a tackle by Birmingham City's Martin Taylor in 2008. In July 2008 he was reported that he was transferred to biggest Dinamo rival Hajduk Split on a free transfer, signing a four-year contract. After securing a first eleven spot in the 2008/2009 season, he was removed from the first team squad in late 2009 for refusing to sign a new contract with a wage cut. A new contract was signed 6 months later, and was set to feature in the first team again, but broke his right leg in training in July 2010, after featuring only in a single league match. He returned to play in 2011, after a 10-month recovery.

International career
He made his debut for Croatia in a March 2006 friendly match against Argentina, coming on as a late substitute for Niko Kranjčar, and earned a total of 2 caps, scoring no goals. His second and final international was a June 2006 friendly against Poland.

References

External links 
 

1981 births
Living people
Sportspeople from Zadar
Association football fullbacks
Croatian footballers
Croatia international footballers
NK Mosor players
HNK Rijeka players
SpVgg Greuther Fürth II players
NK Osijek players
GNK Dinamo Zagreb players
HNK Hajduk Split players
NK Primorac 1929 players
First Football League (Croatia) players
Second Football League (Croatia) players
Croatian Football League players
Oberliga (football) players
Croatian expatriate footballers
Expatriate footballers in Germany
Croatian expatriate sportspeople in Germany